Jamie Scott (née Weisner) (born August 9, 1994) is an American/Canadian professional basketball player, previously playing for the Washington Mystics of the Women's National Basketball Association (WNBA). She was drafted 17th overall by the Connecticut Sun in the 2016 WNBA draft, but cut during the 2016 preseason and signed with the Mystics. Scott played seven games for Washington before being waived on August 24, 2016. Born in Spokane, Washington, she played college basketball for Oregon State. At Oregon State, she was Pac-12 Conference Player of the year following the 2015–16 season in which she led the team to its first Final Four appearance.  Scott played on the Canadian national team during the 2018 World Cup.

Oregon State statistics
Source

References

External links
Jamie Weisner WNBA Stats – Basketball-Reference.com

1994 births
Living people
All-American college women's basketball players
American women's basketball players
Basketball players at the 2019 Pan American Games
Basketball players from Spokane, Washington
Canadian women's basketball players
Connecticut Sun draft picks
Expatriate basketball people in Australia
Guards (basketball)
Oregon State Beavers women's basketball players
People from Clarkston, Washington
Washington Mystics players
Pan American Games competitors for Canada